Thoko Kakhongwe (born ) is a Malawian male weightlifter, competing in the 69 kg category and representing Malawi at international competitions. He participated at the 2010 Commonwealth Games in the 69 kg event.

Major competitions

References

External links
Former champion undermines Master, Ichocho - The Nation Online with picture

1987 births
Living people
Malawian male weightlifters
Weightlifters at the 2010 Commonwealth Games
Commonwealth Games competitors for Malawi
Place of birth missing (living people)